The Audace class of destroyers consisted of two ships— and —that were built for the Italian  (Royal Navy) in the 1910s.

Design
The design for the Audace class was based on that of the earlier , which had been designed by the firm Society Pattison of Naples. The  shipyard modified the design to accept Swiss steam turbines, but the ships were broadly similar, carrying the same armament and having a similar top speed.

They had a crew of 4 to 5 officers and 65 to 74 enlisted men. The ships had a small superstructure that consisted primarily of a conning tower forward. A raised forecastle deck terminated at the conning tower and stepped down to the main deck level for the rest of the length of the hull.

The ships were powered by two Zoelly steam turbines, with steam provided by four White-Forster water-tube boilers.

The ships carried an armament that consisted of a single  40-caliber (cal.) gun and four  40-cal. guns, along with two  torpedo tubes. The 102 mm gun was placed on the forecastle and the two of the 76 mm guns were mounted abreast the funnels, with the remaining pair at the stern. The torpedo tubes were in single mounts, both on the centerline.

Ships

Service history
Audace was accidentally sunk after a collision with the freighter  on a convoy operation during World War I on 30 August 1916. Animoso took part in frequent operations in the Adriatic Sea against Austro-Hungarian light forces in 1917, as well as bombardments of Austro-Hungarian positions ashore in northern Italy.

Animoso was badly damaged by a boiler explosion on 29 July 1921, which ended her career and led to her disposal in 1923.

Notes

References
 
 

Audace-class destroyers (1913)